Venloop is an annual half marathon in the Dutch municipality of Venlo, which was established in 2006. During the event, a 10K run is also held, as well as a 5K run, a 1K run, a 0.5K run and a run for disabled and less abled men and women. In 2012 and 2013 this event had the official status for the Dutch Championship Half Marathon.

The course records are 59:44 for men, set by Kenya's Geoffrey Yegon in 2016, and 1:10:02 for women, achieved by Isabellah Andersson of Sweden in 2010.

Past winners
Key:

References

External links
 Official website
Winners results

Half marathons in the Netherlands
Recurring sporting events established in 2006
2006 establishments in the Netherlands
Sports competitions in Limburg (Netherlands)
Sport in Venlo